Microlipophrys dalmatinus, the blennie dalmate is a species of combtooth blenny found in the northeast Atlantic Ocean near Portugal, and the Mediterranean Sea. This species grows to a length of  TL.

References

dalamtinus
Fish of the Adriatic Sea
Fish of the Mediterranean Sea
Aegean Sea
Fish described in 1883
Taxa named by Franz Steindachner
Taxa named by Juraj Kolombatović